Anthony Alfred Fleger (October 21, 1900 – July 16, 1963) was a U.S. Representative from Ohio.

Life and career
Born in Austria-Hungary, in 1903 Fleger immigrated to the United States with his parents, who settled in Cleveland, Ohio. He attended the public schools and graduated from the John Marshall School of Law, Cleveland, Ohio, in 1926. Fleger was admitted to the bar the same year and commenced practice in Cleveland, Ohio. He later moved to Parma, Ohio, where he served as Justice of the Peace from 1930 to 1932.

He married Mary Nemec, with whom he had two children, Corinne and Donald.

Fleger was elected a member of the Ohio House of Representatives in 1932 and served from January 1, 1933, to December 31, 1933, when he resigned, having been elected mayor of Parma. He served as mayor from January 1, 1934, to December 31, 1935.

Fleger was elected as a Democrat to the 75th United States Congress (January 3, 1937 – January 3, 1939). He was an unsuccessful candidate for reelection in 1938 to the Seventy-sixth Congress and for election in 1940 to the Seventy-seventh Congress and resumed the practice of law in Cleveland, Ohio. Fleger served as special assistant to the Attorney General, Washington, D.C., from March 3, 1941, to July 9, 1950, and as an attorney in the Department of Justice from July 10, 1950, to May 9, 1953.  He engaged in the practice of law in Washington, D.C., and resided in Oxon Hill, Maryland. He died in Alexandria (Virginia) Hospital July 16, 1963. He was interred in Holy Cross Cemetery, Brook Park, Ohio.

References

Sources

 

1900 births
1963 deaths
Austro-Hungarian emigrants to the United States
People from Cleveland
United States Department of Justice lawyers
Mayors of places in Ohio
Democratic Party members of the Ohio House of Representatives
Cleveland–Marshall College of Law alumni
Democratic Party members of the United States House of Representatives from Ohio
People from Parma, Ohio
20th-century American lawyers
20th-century American politicians